

Earth bulk continental crust and upper continental crust
C1 — Crust: CRC Handbook
C2 — Crust: Kaye and Laby 
C3 — Crust: Greenwood
C4 — Crust: Ahrens (Taylor)
C5 — Crust: Ahrens (Wänke)
C6 — Crust: Ahrens (Weaver)
U1 — Upper crust: Ahrens (Taylor)
U2 — Upper crust: Ahrens (Shaw)

Urban soils
The established abundances of chemical elements in urban soils can be considered a geochemical (ecological and geochemical) characteristic, the accumulated impact of technogenic and natural processes at the beginning of the 21st century. The figures estimate average concentrations of chemical elements in the soils of more than 300 cities and settlements in Europe, Asia, Africa, Australia, and America. Regardless of significant differences between abundances of several elements in urban soils and those values calculated for the Earth's crust, the element abundances in urban soils generally reflect those in the Earth's crust. With the development of technology the abundances may be refined.

Mass fraction, in mg/kg (ppm).

Sea water
W1 — CRC Handbook
W2 — Kaye & Laby
Mass per volume fraction, in kg/L. (The average density of sea water in the surface is 1.025 kg/L)

Sun and solar system
S1 — Sun: Kaye & Laby
Y1 — Solar system: Kaye & Laby
Y2 — Solar system: Ahrens, with uncertainty s (%)
Atom mole fraction relative to silicon = 1.

See also
Chemical elements data references

Notes

Due to the estimate nature of these values, no single recommendations are given. All values are normalized for these tables. Underlined zeroes indicate figures of indeterminable significance that were present in the source notation.

References

CRC Handbook
From these sources in an online version of David R. Lide (ed.), CRC Handbook of Chemistry and Physics, 85th Edition. CRC Press. Boca Raton, Florida (2005). Section 14, Geophysics, Astronomy, and Acoustics; Abundance of Elements in the Earth's Crust and in the Sea:
R.S. Carmichael (ed.), CRC Practical Handbook of Physical Properties of Rocks and Minerals, CRC Press, Boca Raton, FL, (1989).
I. Bodek et al., Environmental Inorganic Chemistry, Pergamon Press, New York, (1988).
A.B. Ronov, A.A. Yaroshevsky, Earth's Crust Geochemistry, in Encyclopedia of Geochemistry and Environmental Sciences, R.W. Fairbridge (ed.), Van Nostrand, New York, (1969).
Estimated abundance of the elements in the continental crust (C1) and in seawater near the surface (W1). The median values of reported measurements are given. Concentrations of the less abundant elements may vary with location by several orders of magnitude.

Kaye & Laby
National Physical Laboratory, Kaye and Laby Tables of Physical & Chemical Constants (2005). Section 3.1.3, Abundances of the elements, B.E.J. Pagel
Abundances in sea water (W2) and in crustal rocks (C2) from:
K.K. Turekian (1970) in McGraw-Hill Encyclopedia of Science and Technology, 4, 627.
For the sun (S1) and the solar system (Y1) from:
N. Grevesse, E. Anders, J. Waddington (ed.) in Cosmic Abundances of Matter, Amer. Inst. Phys., New York, p. 1. (1988).
Except solar iron abundance from:
H. Holweger, A. Bard, A. Kock, M. Kock, Astron. Astrophys., 249, 545. (1991).
Accuracy of the solar abundances varies between ± 10% and a factor of two, values more uncertain than that are marked with "about". The solar system abundances are mainly derived from carbonaceous chondrite meteorites and are assumed generally accurate to ±10% or better. Solar system abundances based on other sources are marked with asterisks (*).

Greenwood
A. Earnshaw, N. Greenwood, Chemistry of the Elements, 2nd edition, Butterworth-Heinemann, (1997).  Appendix 4, Abundance of Elements in Crustal Rocks.
From this source with some modifications and additions of later data:
W.S. Fyfe, Geochemistry, Oxford University Press, (1974).
Further referring to:
C.K. Jorgensen, Comments Astrophys. 17, 49–101 (1993).
Values are subject to various geological assumptions but assumed acceptable as an indication of elemental abundance in crustal rocks (C3).

Ahrens

Bulk continental crust (C4) and upper continental crust (U1) from:
S.R. Taylor, S.M. McLennan, The continental crust: Its composition and evolution, Blackwell  Sci. Publ., Oxford, 330 pp. (1985).
Upper continental crust (U2) from:
D.M. Shaw, J. Dostal, R.R. Keays, Additional estimates of continental surface Precambrian  shield composition in Canada, Geochim. Cosmochim. Acta, 40, 73–83, (1976).
Bulk continental crust (C5) from:
H. Wänke, G. Dreibus, E. Jagoutz, Mantle chemistry and accretion history of the Earth, in Archean Geochemistry, A. Kröner, G.N. Hanson, A.M. Goodwin (eds.), pp. l-24, Springer-Verlag, Berlin, (1984).
Bulk continental crust (C6) from:
B.L. Weaver, J. Tamey, Major and trace element composition of the continental lithosphere, in Physics and Chemistry of the Earth, 15, H.N. Pollack, V.R. Murthy (eds.) pp. 39–68, Pergamon,  Oxford, (1984).
Solar system (Y2) from:

Urban soils
Alekseenko V.A., Alekseenko A.V. (2013) Chemical elements in geochemical systems. The abundances in urban soils. Publishing House of Southern Federal University, Rostov-on-Don (388 pp., in Russian with English Abstract). 
Vladimir Alekseenko, Alexey Alekseenko (2014) The abundances of chemical elements in urban soils. Journal of Geochemical Exploration. No. 147 (B). pp. 245–249. 

Properties of chemical elements
Chemical element data pages